Timber Lake is a lake located in Lake County, California. It lies at an elevation of 4,872 feet.

See also
List of lakes in California
List of lakes in Lake County, California

References

Lakes of Lake County, California
Lakes of California
Lakes of Northern California